German Mikhailovich Titov (born October 16, 1965) is a Russian former professional ice hockey forward.

Playing career 
Titov started his career with Khimik Voskresensk of the Soviet Hockey League. He remained with the team until 1992 when he spent one season in Finland's SM-liiga for TPS, where he scored 25 goals in 47 games.

At 27, Titov was drafted 252nd overall by the Calgary Flames in the 1993 NHL Entry Draft and made his NHL debut with the Flames in the 1993–94 season. The 1995–96 season was Titov's best NHL season, scoring 28 goals and 37 assists for 67 points. In 1998, Titov was traded to the Pittsburgh Penguins but was unable to match the same goal-scoring production he achieved at Calgary. He was later traded to the Edmonton Oilers in March 2000 but scored no goals in seven games. He then signed with the Mighty Ducks of Anaheim and stayed for two seasons but his scoring production dropped further.

He left the NHL after the 2001–02 season and after sitting out a year, he went back to the team he had played for before coming to the NHL, Khimik Voskresensk. He played there until his retirement in 2005.

Titov also played for the Russian national team, winning a gold medal in the 1993 Ice Hockey World Championship and a silver medal in the 1998 Winter Olympics in Nagano, Japan.

Coaching career 
In the 2014–15 season, he was the head coach of Metallurg Novokuznetsk in the Kontinental Hockey League. In the 2015–16 season (until October 2016), he was the head coach for Spartak Moscow.

Career statistics

Regular season and playoffs

International

References

External links 

1965 births
Living people
Calgary Flames draft picks
Calgary Flames players
Edmonton Oilers players
HC Khimik Voskresensk players
Ice hockey people from Moscow
Ice hockey players at the 1998 Winter Olympics
Medalists at the 1998 Winter Olympics
Mighty Ducks of Anaheim players
Olympic ice hockey players of Russia
Olympic medalists in ice hockey
Olympic silver medalists for Russia
Pittsburgh Penguins players
Russian ice hockey centres
Soviet ice hockey centres
HC TPS players